Bread and Roses is a 1993 biographical film showing significant episodes in the political life of socialist and feminist Sonja Davies, based on her autobiography of the same name.
She is portrayed from her early years to her election to the Nelson Hospital Board.
Made as a Suffrage Year tribute to the women of New Zealand.
Helen Martin says the film is fascinating as a social history, showing her empathy with working class women.
The film was shown on television in four episodes in October 1993.

Cast

References

External links
 
 Bread and Roses at NZ Film Archive 
 Bread and Roses at NZonScreen (with video extracts)

1993 films
New Zealand biographical drama films
1990s biographical films
Films set in New Zealand
Films shot in New Zealand
New Zealand biographical films
1990s New Zealand films
1990s English-language films